Moon Bin (born January 26, 1998), known professionally as Moonbin, is a South Korean singer, actor, dancer and model under the label of Fantagio. He is a member of the South Korean boy group Astro and its sub-unit Moonbin & Sanha.

Early life 
Moon Bin was born on January 26, 1998, in Cheongju, Chungbuk Province. He attended and graduated from Hanlim Multi Art School, with focus in Practical Music.

He has a younger sister, Moon Sua, who is a member of the South Korean girl group Billlie.

Career

2006–2015: Pre-debut 
Under the influence of his mother, Moon Bin debuted as a child model and ulzzang in 2004. His first known appearance was in 2006, where he appeared in TVXQ's  music video for their song "Balloons" portraying a mini U-Know Yunho.

In 2009, he had his first acting role in the Korean drama Boys over Flowers where he played the younger version of Kim Bum's character.

Moon Bin was a trainee of Fantagio since he was in the fifth grade, becoming a full-fledged trainee in his middle school years. He participated in the company's boy group project iTeen, and was the second trainee to be introduced with the Fantagio iTeen Photo Test Cut.

Prior to making his debut with Astro, Moon Bin along with the rest of the group starred in a web-drama, titled To Be Continued.

2016–2019: Debut with Astro, solo activities and hiatus 

Moon Bin debuted as part of the six-member boy group Astro on February 23, 2016. Their debut extended play, Spring Up, contained five songs; including the lead single "Hide & Seek".

On September 7, 2018, Moon Bin was announced to be part of The Ultimate Watchlist of Latest Trends for the first two seasons.

On January 17, 2019, Moon Bin had been confirmed to have been cast in Moments of Eighteen, where he played the character of Jung Oh-je.

On November 12, 2019, Fantagio reported that due to health reasons, Moon Bin would be absent from their upcoming promotions for their Blue Flame EP release.

2020–present: Return from hiatus and unit debut 
On February 14, 2020,  Moon Bin appeared in a Vlive broadcast with the other Astro members, ending his hiatus.

On March 4, 2020, Moon Bin along with his bandmate Yoon San-ha and Verivery's Kangmin were announced to be the new hosts of the Korean music show Show Champion.

On March 12, 2020, he was confirmed to play the lead role in the web-drama The Mermaid Prince, a role which he reprised for a second season.

On May 26, 2020, Moon Bin joined the eco-friendly cooking program Food Avengers. In September 2020, Moon Bin was announced as one of Nerdy Cafe's model.

On September 14, 2020, Moon Bin and band-mate Yoon San-ha debuted as Astro's first sub-unit  Moonbin & Sanha with the release of their debut EP, In-Out along with its lead single, "Bad Idea". The unit received their first music show win from The Show eight days later, becoming the fastest sub-unit to receive a first music show win.

On September 3, 2021, Neikidnis revealed that it has selected Moon Bin as their first muse.

On December 22, 2021, It was revealed that Moon Bin has been added as a cast member for the second season of Coupang Play's Saturday Night Live Korea.

On December 30, 2022, Fantagio released an official statement and stated that Moon Bin had decided to renew his contract with the agency.

Discography

Composition credits 
All credits are listed under the Korea Music Copyright Association unless otherwise stated.

Filmography

Television series

Web series

Television shows

Web shows

Hosting

Awards and nominations

Notes

References

External links 

1998 births
Living people
People from Cheongju
South Korean male idols
South Korean male television actors
K-pop singers
Fantagio artists
Astro (South Korean band) members
21st-century South Korean male singers
Hanlim Multi Art School alumni